Mean Chey is a khum (commune) of Samlout District in Battambang Province in north-western Cambodia.

Villages

 Sre Sdao
 Kampong Touk
 Sre Chi Pao
 Kam Chat
 Ambib
 Ta Non

References

Communes of Battambang province
Samlout District